Kalateh-ye Seyyed Sadeq (also Romanized as Kalāteh-ye Seyyed Sādeq) is a village in Kenevist Rural District, in the Central District of Mashhad County, Razavi Khorasan Province, Iran. At the 2006 census, its population was 23, in 8 families.

References 

Populated places in Mashhad County